Babhani may refer to:
Babhani, Nepal, a village
Babhani, Uttar Pradesh, a village in India
Babhani, a subtribe of the Dombki Baloch tribe